The Dean and Chapter of St Paul's Cathedral was the titular corporate body of St Paul's Cathedral in London up to the end of the twentieth century. It consisted of the dean and the canons, priests attached to the cathedral who were known as "prebendaries" because of the source of their income. The Dean and Chapter (or "Greater Chapter") was made up of a large number of priests who would meet "in chapter", but such meetings were infrequent and the actual governance was done by the Administrative Chapter headed by the dean, made up of several senior "residentiary canons", who were also known as the "Dean and Canons of St Paul’s" or simply "The Chapter".

The Cathedrals Measure 1999, a reform applying to nearly all cathedrals, termed the main governing body of the cathedrals "the Chapter"; reformed the Greater Chapter to include archdeacons and suffragan and assistant bishops (but not the diocesan bishop) as well as lay canons, giving it the title "The College of Canons" with the dean as its president; and also introduced a "Cathedral Council" responsible for changing the Constitution and Statutes and for approving the budget and accounts. The Measure also required lay people to be appointed to the Chapter. The titular corporate body has been known since 2000 as "The Corporation of the Cathedral Church of St Paul in London", and its membership consists of the members for the time being of the Chapter, the College of Canons, and the Council: the term "Dean and Chapter" is no longer valid in law. The Chapter is headed by the Dean of St Paul's, currently the Very Revd David Ison who was installed on 25 May 2012, and includes four ordained residentiary canons and up to four lay people.

Up to the early twentieth century canons were attached to prebendal stalls, and by the early thirteenth century, there were 30 of these. Many of the prebendal manors were some distance from the cathedral. For many years, the rents of these manors provided sufficiently valuable income to render the great majority of the prebendaries indifferent to reside at the cathedral and benefit from the increase in income that this would provide. Many of the prebends were awarded to senior clergy, including archdeacons and bishops, to top-up insufficient income from their archbishoprics, bishoprics and archdeaconries.

Fourteen of the prebendaries later became archbishops.

The prebendaries survived the reforms during the middle of the sixteenth century, perhaps because the cathedral had not been a monastic institution. The prebendal estates were taken over by the Ecclesiastical Commissioners in the later nineteenth century in exchange for a cash payment, the value of which was almost entirely lost to inflation during the twentieth century. The role of prebendary has become unpaid and largely honorary.

Deans of St Pauls

See Deans of St Paul's.

Prebendaries of Broomesbury

Prebendaries of Brownswood

Prebendaries of Caddington Major

Prebendaries of Caddington Minor

Prebendaries of Cantlers
The Prebend of Cantlers consisted of a manor in the area now known as Kentish Town.

Prebendaries of Chamberlainwood

Prebendaries of Chiswick

Prebendaries of Consumpta-Per-Mare

Prebendaries of Ealdland

Prebendaries of Ealdstreet

Prebendaries of Finsbury

Prebendaries of Harleston
Harlesden, Middlesex

Prebendaries of Holbourn

Prebendaries of Hoxton

Prebendaries of Islington

Prebendaries of Mapesbury

Prebendaries of Mora

Prebendaries Of Nesden

Prebendaries of Newington

Prebendaries of Oxgate

Prebendaries of Pancratius
St Pancras

Prebendaries of Portpool
See Portpool

Prebendaries of Reculversland

Prebendaries of Rugmere

Prebendaries of Sneating

Prebendaries of Totenhall

Prebendaries of Twiford

Prebendaries of Weldland

Prebendaries of Wenlocksbarn

Prebendaries of Wilsden

References

St Paul's Cathedral
History of the Church of England
Anglican ecclesiastical offices
Church of England lists
1090 establishments in England